Talk About Eve is the third studio album from Taiwanese female singer-songwriter, Eve Ai, released on 27 May 2016. She has received seven nominations from 28th Golden Melody Awards and won the Golden Melody Award for Best Female Vocalist Mandarin.

Tracklisting
CD

Awards and nominations

Music Videos

References 

Eve Ai albums
2016 albums